Nuria Mayqueling Márquez Medina (born 29 February 2000). known as Mayqueling Márquez, is a Nicaraguan footballer who plays as a right midfielder for Salvadoran club Alianza FC and the Nicaragua women's national team.

Early life
Márquez was born in León. When she was 9, she lived for some months in San Miguel, El Salvador. During that time, she played her first football match, being part of a men's team. She returned to San Miguel at 15 and played for women's youth team ADFA. After that, she went back to Nicaragua, where she finished her youth career at Real Estelí FC, which would later promote her to the first team.

Club career
Márquez has played for the first team of Nicaraguan club Real Estelí FC for two years. In 2019, she returned once more to El Salvador to play for CD Águila at that year Apertura tournament. In 2020, she moved to fellow Salvadoran club Alianza.

International career
In January 2021, Márquez stated one of her football dreams was to represent El Salvador. However, she made her senior debut for Nicaragua three months later, on 8 April 2021, as a 42nd-minute substitution in a 2–0 friendly away win over precisely El Salvador.

References 

2000 births
Living people
Sportspeople from León, Nicaragua
Nicaraguan women's footballers
Women's association football midfielders
Real Estelí F.C. players
C.D. Águila footballers
Alianza F.C. footballers
Nicaragua women's international footballers
Nicaraguan expatriate footballers
Nicaraguan expatriate sportspeople in El Salvador
Expatriate footballers in El Salvador